Paradise for Two may refer to:
 Paradise for Two (1937 film), a British musical comedy film
 Paradise for Two (1927 film), an American silent romantic comedy film